Hadopyrgus rawhiti is a critically endangered species of freshwater snail native to New Zealand.

Habitat 
This snail has been found in only one location: a seepage by a waterfall in a stream between Hopewell & Raetihi, behind Double Bay, Kenepuru Sound. The population trend of this snail is currently unknown, but it is considered potentially threatened by habitat destruction.

Conservation status  
In November 2018 the Department of Conservation classified Hadopyrgus rawhiti as Nationally Critical under the New Zealand Threat Classification System. The species was judged as meeting the criteria for Nationally Critical threat status as a result of it only being found in one location which was less than 1 ha in size.

References 

Gastropods described in 2008
Endangered biota of New Zealand
Gastropods of New Zealand
Tateidae